Ubi primum (Latin for "When first" or "As soon as," the opening words of the encyclical) is an encyclical of Pope Pius IX to the bishops of the Catholic Church asking them for opinion on the definition of a dogma on the Immaculate Conception of the Virgin Mary. It was issued on February 2, 1849.

Background
In the 19th century, there was an increase in veneration of Mary under the title "Immaculata". In France, Archbishop de Quélen of Paris actively promoted the devotion of the Miraculous Medal. In 1843 the title "Queen conceived without original sin" was added to the Litany of Loreto, partly through the efforts of Antonio Rosmini, founder of the Institute of Charity. That same year, the twenty-three bishops present at the Sixth Provincial Council of Baltimore chose "Mary conceived without sin" as the patron saint of the United States.

Development
In 1848 Pius IX established a commission of theologians, to study the subject and report their opinion. Rosmini, who served as a consultor on the commission, suggested that the Holy See should solicit views from the whole of Church through an encyclical to the bishops. Ubi primum seeks the opinions of the bishops on the question.  As stated above, the title "Ubi primum" derives from the opening words of the encyclical ("When first" or "As soon as").  The opening line reads, "When first, certainly by no merits of Ours, but by the mysterious design of divine providence, We were raised to the sublime Chair of the Prince of the Apostles," or in Latin, "Ubi primum nullis certe Nostris meritis, sed arcano divinae providentiae consilio ad sublimem Principis Apostolorum Cathedram evecti...."

Content
Pius begins by acknowledging the numerous requests received by both his predecessor, Pope Gregory XVI, as well as himself for a declaration of the dogma.  

We eagerly desire, furthermore, that, as soon as possible, you apprise Us concerning the devotion which animates your clergy and your people regarding the Immaculate Conception of the Blessed Virgin and how ardently glows the desire that this doctrine be defined by the Apostolic See. And especially, Venerable Brethren, We wish to know what you yourselves, in your wise judgment, think and desire on this matter.

Over 600 bishops responded, almost all favorably. The positive response to Ubi primum led to the 1854 bull Ineffabilis Deus, which defined the dogma of the Immaculate Conception. In April 1850, Dom Prosper Guéranger, abbot of St. Peter's Abbey, Solesmes, published Mémoire sur l'Immaculée Conception demonstrating why belief in the Immaculate Conception might be the object of a dogmatic definition.

This approach was quoted by Pope Pius XII in 1946, when in Deiparae Virginis Mariae, he inquired from the bishops about a possible dogma of the Assumption of the Virgin Mary.

See also

 Ad diem illum
 Fulgens corona
 Ineffabilis Deus
 List of encyclicals of Pope Pius IX
 Marian papal encyclicals and Apostolic Letters

Notes

External links
 Ubi Primum
 text of Ubi Primum
 Pope Pius XII, Mariological encyclicals and bulls
  Encyclical Fulgens corona on the Vatican website
 Encyclical Ad Caeli Reginam on the Vatican website
  Encyclical Deiparae Virginis Mariae on the Vatican website
 Encyclical Ingruentium malorum  on the Vatican website
 Papal Bull Ineffabilis Deus on Google Books

Papal encyclicals
Catholic Mariology
Pope Pius IX Mariology
Documents of Pope Pius IX
1849 documents
1849 in Christianity
February 1849 events